Dynasty is the sixth solo album by house DJ Kaskade. It was released on iTunes on April 27, 2010, and physically on May 11, 2010. It debuted at number 1 on the Billboard Heatseekers Albums chart, number 4 on the Billboard Dance/Electronic Albums chart, and number 104 on the Billboard 200.
The songs "Dynasty," "Fire in Your New Shoes" and "Call Out" were released as promo singles on iTunes in April, 2010, preceding the album's release.

Track listing
This album was also released with extended versions available on Beatport and Juno.

Chart performance

References

2010 albums
Kaskade albums